Chock is a surname. Notable people with the surname include:
 Eric Chock, Hawaiian poet, scholar and editor
 Madison Chock (born 1992), American dancer
 Naomi Takemoto-Chock (fl. 1980s), American psychologist

See also 
 Chock (disambiguation)